Hercules separating the mounts Calpe And Abyla is a work by Francisco de Zurbarán, created in 1634.

Description
The painting is 136 × 167 centimeters.
It is in the collection of the Museo del Prado.

Analysis 
The painting shows Hercules. He separates the two mountains Calpe and Abyla, also known as Pillars of Hercules.

It is included in a 10 works series about the Labors of Hercules commanded by Philip IV of Spain for the Hall of Realms of the Buen Retiro Palace. The series is now conserved in the Museo del Prado.

References

Bibliography 
 Juan Antonio Gaya Nuño et Tiziana Frati, La obra Pictórica de Zurbarán, éditions Planeta, Barcelone, 1988,  p. 131-132.

Paintings depicting Heracles
1630s paintings
Strait of Gibraltar
Paintings by Francisco de Zurbarán in the Museo del Prado